Akaki Tsereteli State University, also known as Kutaisi University, is a university established in July 1930 in Tbilisi, Georgia, and now located in Kutaisi.

History

The university was established on the basis of Tbilisi State University. Tbilisi State University had been founded under guidance of Georgian historian Ivane Javakhishvili in 1918. In July 1930, when Georgia had already fallen under Soviet rule, the authorities abolished Tbilisi State University, creating four independent institutions in its place. State Pedagogical Institute was one of those universities.

On January 8, 1933, Tbilisi State University was re-established and State Pedagogical Institute moved to Kutaisi. Now named Kutaisi University and located in the center of the city, it started functioning from February 13, 1933. Up to 700 students moved to Kutaisi from Tbilisi to continue their studies at the university.

In 1990, the university was transformed into Akaki Tsereteli State University, being named after Georgian poet and national liberation movement figure Akaki Tsereteli. On February 23, 2006, the authorities merged the university with Kutaisi N. Muskhelishvili Polytechnic Institute which was founded on September 1, 1974, enhancing its faculty and curriculum on technical subjects.

Faculties
As of 2019, the Akaki Tsereteli State University operated the following faculties:
 Faculty of Humanitarian
 Faculty of Pedagogics
 Faculty of Exact and Natural sciences
 Faculty of Business, Law and Social sciences
 Faculty of Medicine
 Faculty of Technical Engineering 
 Faculty of Technological Engineering 
 Faculty of Agriculture
 Faculty of Maritime-transportation

Alumni
 Lado Asatiani

See also
Kutaisi University
Tbilisi State University

References

External links
Official website of Akaki Tsereteli State University 

Universities in Georgia (country)
Educational institutions established in 1930
Universities and institutes established in the Soviet Union
Buildings and structures in Kutaisi
1930 establishments in Georgia (country)